The 1959–60 West Virginia Mountaineers men's basketball team represented West Virginia University in the 1959–60 college basketball season. At the time, the Mountaineers were a member of the Southern Conference and coached by Fred Schaus in what proved to be his final year in Morgantown. After the season, he became head coach of the NBA's Los Angeles Lakers, newly relocated from Minneapolis, where he was reunited with his graduated superstar player Jerry West.

NCAA basketball tournament
East
West Virginia 94, Navy 86
NYU 82, West Virginia 81

Team players drafted into the NBA

 The Lakers participated in the draft as the Minneapolis Lakers, but moved to Los Angeles before the start of the 1960–61 season.

References

West Virginia Mountaineers men's basketball seasons
Southern Conference men's basketball champion seasons
West Virginia
West Virginia Mountaineers men's basketball
West Virginia Mountaineers men's basketball